Johan Wahjudi (10 February 1953 – 15 November 2019) was an Indonesian badminton player. Though he played some singles at the international level early in his career, he soon became a doubles specialist noted for his alert and consistent play alongside his more mercurial partner Tjun Tjun.

Career
Wahjudi and Tjun won men's doubles in the IBF's first World Championships in 1977.

They also won 6 All England Open Badminton Championships between 1974 and 1980  during which time their losses were rare and they were clearly the world's number one team. Wahjudi played on Indonesia's world champion Thomas Cup (men's international) teams of 1976 and 1979 winning all of his matches in partnership with Tjun Tjun.

Achievements

World Championships 

Men's doubles

Asian Games 
Men's doubles

Southeast Asian Games 
Men's doubles

International Open Tournaments (12 titles, 2 runners-up)
Men's doubles

Mixed doubles

Invitational Tournament 

Men's doubles

References

1953 births
2019 deaths
Indonesian male badminton players
Asian Games medalists in badminton
Badminton players at the 1974 Asian Games
Indonesian people of Chinese descent
Asian Games gold medalists for Indonesia
Asian Games silver medalists for Indonesia
Southeast Asian Games gold medalists for Indonesia
Southeast Asian Games medalists in badminton
Medalists at the 1974 Asian Games
Competitors at the 1977 Southeast Asian Games
Sportspeople from Malang
20th-century Indonesian people
21st-century Indonesian people